Spain participated in the Eurovision Song Contest 2021 with the song "" written by Blas Cantó, Leroy Sanchez, Daniel Ortega "Dangelo" and Dan Hammond. The song was performed by Blas Cantó, who was internally selected by the Spanish broadcaster  (TVE) to represent Spain at the 2021 contest in Rotterdam, Netherlands after he was due to compete in the 2020 contest with "" before the event's cancellation. Blas Cantó was announced as the Spanish representative on 18 March 2020, while the national final  was organised in order to select the song Cantó would perform. Two songs competed in the televised show where a public vote exclusively selected "" as the winning song, receiving 58% of the votes.

As a member of the "Big Five", Spain automatically qualified to compete in the final of the Eurovision Song Contest. Performing in position 13, Spain placed twenty-fourth out of the 26 participating countries with 6 points.

Background 

The nation has won the contest on two occasions: in 1968 with the song "" performed by Massiel and in 1969 with the song "" performed by Salomé, the latter having won in a four-way tie with France, the Netherlands and the United Kingdom. Spain has also finished second four times, with Karina in 1971, Mocedades in 1973, Betty Missiego in 1979 and Anabel Conde in 1995. In 2019, Spain placed twenty-second with the song "" performed by Miki.

The Spanish national broadcaster,  (TVE), broadcasts the event within Spain and organises the selection process for the nation's entry. TVE confirmed their intentions to participate at the 2021 Eurovision Song Contest on 18 March 2020. In 2020, TVE selected both the artist and song that would compete at the Eurovision Song Contest via an internal selection. For their 2021 entry, the broadcaster opted to internally select the artist that would compete at the Eurovision Song Contest, while the song would be selected via a national final.

Before Eurovision

Internal selection
On 18 March 2020, TVE confirmed that Blas Cantó would remain as the Spanish representative for the Eurovision Song Contest 2021. In regards to his re-selection as the Spanish entrant, Cantó stated: "There is a commitment on my part to continue working on our candidacy in 2021 and I am very happy to have the opportunity to do so next year." On 29 December 2020, the broadcaster revealed that a national final would select the song Blas Cantó would sing.

Destino Eurovisión 2021 
 was the national final organised by TVE that took place on 20 February 2021 at Prado del Rey in Pozuelo de Alarcón, Community of Madrid, hosted by Tony Aguilar, Julia Varela and Víctor Escudero. Ten songs were proposed by songwriters who usually work with Blas Cantó and a committee consisting of members of TVE and Warner Music Spain selected two songs for the national final together with Cantó and his team, which premiered on 10 February 2021 via TVE's official website. The winning song, "", was selected exclusively by a public vote via telephone, SMS and TVE's official Eurovision app and website, held between 10 and 20 February 2021. The national final was watched by 969,000 viewers in Spain with a market share of 6.1%.

In addition to the performances of the competing entries, guest performers included Vanesa Martín, Nia, Andrés Suárez, Cepeda, Roi, Alba, Lydia Fairen and Lucía Estrella, former national final participant Mirela, and former Eurovision contestants Pastora Soler and Edurne which represented Spain in 2012 and 2015, respectively.

At Eurovision 
According to Eurovision rules, all nations with the exceptions of the host country and the "Big Five" (France, Germany, Italy, Spain and the United Kingdom) are required to qualify from one of two semi-finals in order to compete for the final; the top ten countries from each semi-final progress to the final. As a member of the "Big 5", Spain automatically qualified to compete in the final on 22 May 2021. In addition to their participation in the final, Spain is also required to broadcast and vote in one of the two semi-finals. For the 2021 contest, the semi-final allocation draw held for 2020 which was held on 28 January 2020, was used. Spain was assigned to broadcast and vote in the second semi-final on 20 May 2021.

The Spanish spokesperson, who announced the top 12-point score awarded by the Spanish jury during the final, was Nieves Álvarez.

Final 
Blas Cantó took part in technical rehearsals on 13 and 15 May, followed by dress rehearsals on 19, 21 and 22 May. This included the semi-final jury show on 19 May where an extended clip of the Spanish performance was filmed for broadcast during the live show on 20 May and the jury final on 21 May where the professional juries of each country watched and voted on the competing entries. After technical rehearsals were held on 15 May, the "Big 5" countries and host country Netherlands held a press conference. As part of this press conference, the artists took part in a draw to determine which half of the grand final they would subsequently participate in. Spain was drawn to compete in the first half. Following the conclusion of the second semi-final, the shows' producers decided upon the running order of the final. The running order for the semi-finals and final was decided by the shows' producers rather than through another draw, so that similar songs were not placed next to each other. Spain was subsequently placed to perform in position 13, following the entry from Iceland and before the entry from Moldova.

The Spanish performance featured Blas Cantó on stage wearing a black shirt and trousers designed by Jaime Álvarez. The stage lighting and LED screens displayed blue colours and a starry background with an eclipse appearing with a light source behind a moon. During the performance, a six-metre wide moon prop, which represented the cycle of life as explained by the head of the Spanish delegation Ana Bordas, descended from the stage ceiling above Cantó, with the LED screens transitioning to shooting stars that came behind the moon. The performance was concluded with the moon in red-lit colours and the stage displaying orange, gold and pink lighting with a gold starry galaxy on the LED screens. The stage director for the performance was Marvin Dietmann. An additional five off-stage backing vocalists were also part of the performance: Alba Gil, Héctor Artiles, Daira Monzón, Irene Alman and the co-composer of "" Dángelo Ortega. Spain placed twenty-fourth in the final, scoring 6 points: 0 points from the televoting and 6 points from the juries.

Voting 
Voting during the three shows involved each country awarding two sets of points from 1-8, 10 and 12: one from their professional jury and the other from televoting. Each nation's jury consisted of five music industry professionals who are citizens of the country they represent, with a diversity in gender and age represented. The judges assess each entry based on the performances during the second Dress Rehearsal of each show, which takes place the night before each live show, against a set of criteria including: vocal capacity; the stage performance; the song's composition and originality; and the overall impression by the act. Jury members may only take part in panel once every three years, and are obliged to confirm that they are not connected to any of the participating acts in a way that would impact their ability to vote impartially. Jury members should also vote independently, with no discussion of their vote permitted with other jury members. The exact composition of the professional jury, and the results of each country's jury and televoting were released after the grand final; the individual results from each jury member were also released in an anonymised form.

Below is a breakdown of points awarded to Spain and awarded by Spain in the second semi-final and grand final of the contest, and the breakdown of the jury voting and televoting conducted during the two shows:

Points awarded to Spain

Points awarded by Spain

Detailed voting results 
The following members comprised the Spanish jury:
 
 
 María Peláe
 Nerea Rodríguez

References 

2021
Countries in the Eurovision Song Contest 2021
Eurovision
Eurovision